Nice Githinji is a Kenyan actress, producer, karaoke hostess, vocalist and TV show host. She is most notable for playing various roles in several television series, including Rafiki. 

Githinji came into the limelight after being nominated for the 2009 Kalasha Awards as the Best Lead Actress in the film, All Girls Together. In 2011, she won the coveted award for Best lead actress  for her role in a drama television series, Changing Times. 

Nice is also the CEO of Nicebird Production Company that majors in film productions  and participates in theatrical performance. According  to her time to time statement, this performances are the core of her.

Nice has worked with film industry veterans like Et Cetera Productions (2007  2008: where she starred in two movies; the critically acclaimed, Benta and All Girls Together, Sisimka Productions, Phoenix Players  and Planet's Theater.

Early life 
Nice was born in 1985 in Mombasa. She did her high school in Senior Chief Koinange High School from 1999 to 2002. Her mother died when she had finished high school.

Career

Early career beginnings and initialization of showbiz career 
Nice Githinji began her acting career as a stage actress at Phoenix Players Richard Stockwell’s Bad Blood, a role that catapulted her career at large. She has appeared in a number of Television and film productions.

2007  2009 
Between 2007 and 2010, She appeared in a number of films namely;  Benta, All Girls Together, Formula X and Pieces of Peace. She also starred in television series; Guy Centre and Changing Times where she played Candy and Rosa respectively.

Filmography

Film and television

References 

1985 births
Living people
Kenyan television actresses
Kenyan female models
Kenyan film actresses
21st-century Kenyan actresses
21st-century Kenyan women singers
People from Mombasa
Kenyan film producers
Kenyan telenovela actresses